The Baton Rouge metropolitan statistical area, as defined by the United States Office of Management and Budget, or simply the Baton Rouge metropolitan area or Greater Baton Rouge, is a sprawling metropolitan statistical area surrounding the city of Baton Rouge. Its principal city Baton Rouge is unusual because it has no major incorporated satellite cities, a rarity for a metropolitan area of its size. Including the western edge of the Florida Parishes regions, it is known as "Plantation Country", the "Capital Region", and "The 225" (a reference to its area code). At the 2010 U.S. census, the metropolitan area had a population of 802,484, up from 705,973 in 2000. At the 2020 census, its population increased to 870,569, up from 2020 estimates at 858,571.

Parishes
Ascension
East Baton Rouge
East Feliciana
Iberville
Livingston
Pointe Coupee
St. Helena
West Baton Rouge
West Feliciana

Communities

Places with more than 225,000 inhabitants
Baton Rouge (Principal city)

Places with 10,000 to 30,000 inhabitants

Baker
Central
Denham Springs
Gardere (census-designated place)
Gonzales
Merrydale (census-designated place)
Shenandoah (census-designated place)
Zachary
Prairieville (census-designated place)

Places with 5,000 to 10,000 inhabitants

Brownfields (census-designated place)
Donaldsonville
Oak Hills Place (census-designated place)
Old Jefferson (census-designated place)
Plaquemine
Port Allen
St. Gabriel
Village St. George (census-designated place)
Walker

Places with 1,000 to 5,000 inhabitants

Addis
Brusly
Clinton
Inniswold (census-designated place)
Jackson
Killian
Livingston
Livonia
Maringouin
Monticello (census-designated place)
New Roads
St. Francisville
Slaughter
Sorrento
Westminster (census-designated place)
White Castle

Places with fewer than 1,000 inhabitants

Albany
Fordoche
French Settlement
Greensburg
Grosse Tête
Montpelier
Morganza
Norwood
Port Vincent
Rosedale
Springfield
Wilson

Unincorporated places

Abend
Acy
Alma
Anchor
Barmen
Batchelor
Bayou Goula
Bayou Latenache
Bayou Pigeon
Baywood
Belle Helene
Blanks
Bowden
Brignac
Brittany
Brooks 
Bullion
Burnside
Chenal
Cofield
Columbo
Colyell
Coon
Cornerview
Darrow
Duckroost
Duplessis
Dupont
Dutchtown
East Krotz Springs
Elliot City
False River
Frisco
Galvez
Geismar
Glynn
Hermitage
Hillaryville
Hobart
Hohen Solms
Holden
Hope Villa
Ingleside
Innis
Jacoby
Jarreau
LaBarre
Lacour
Lake
Lakeland
Legonier
Lemannville
Lettsworth
Little Prairie
Lottie
Marchand
Maurepas
McCrea
McElroy
Miles
Mix
Modeste
New California
New Texas
Noel
Oak Grove
Oscar
Palo Alto
Parlange
Philadelphia Point
Point Coupee
Red Cross
Red River Landing
Rougon
Saint Amant
St. Dizier
Saint Elmo
Satsuma
Sherburne
Smoke Bend
Southwood
Torbert
Torras
Valverda
Ventress
Wakefield
Waterloo
Watson
Weber City

Demographics

The Baton Rouge metropolitan area was first defined in 1950. Then known as the Baton Rouge standard metropolitan area (or Baton Rouge SMA), it consisted of a single parish–East Baton Rouge–and had a population of 158,236. Following a term change by the Bureau of the Budget (present-day U.S. Office of Management and Budget) in 1959, the Baton Rouge SMA became the Baton Rouge standard metropolitan statistical area (or Baton Rouge SMSA).

By the census of 1960, the population had grown to 230,058, a 45% increase over the previous census. A total of 285,167 people lived in East Baton Rouge Parish in 1970.

Three additional parishes were added to the Baton Rouge SMSA in 1973–Ascension, Livingston, and West Baton Rouge. These four parishes had a combined population of 375,628 in 1970. The area grew rapidly during the 1970s and by the 1980 census, the population had increased 32% to 494,151. In 1983, the official name was shortened to the Baton Rouge metropolitan statistical area (or Baton Rouge MSA), which is still in use to date. It was determined 528,264 residents lived in the metropolitan statistical area in 1990, and 602,894 people lived in the four parishes by the year 2000.

In 2003, the Baton Rouge area was expanded to its current size with the addition of five more parishes: East Feliciana, Iberville, Pointe Coupee, St. Helena, and West Feliciana. This nine-parish region had a population of 705,973 in 2000.

At the 2019 American Community Survey, the metropolitan area had an estimated population of 854,884. In 2020, its population was an estimated 858,571. The 2020 U.S. census tabulated a population of 870,569. In 2019, the racial and ethnic makeup of the area was 56% White, 36% Black and African American, 2% Asian, 1% multiracial, and 4% Hispanic and Latin American of any race. There was a median household income of $60,746 and per capita income of $31,571. An estimated 15% of the metropolitan population lived at or below the poverty line. Of the population in 2019, there were 305,441 households and an average of 3.7 people per household. The median value of owner-occupied housing units was $195,500, and 4% of its population was foreign born.

Economy 

The metropolitan economy is primarily centered in the city of Baton Rouge; dominated by oil and gas companies, alongside the Louisiana State University System, the area has the furthest inland port on the Mississippi River that can accommodate ocean-going tankers and cargo carriers. ExxonMobil's Baton Rouge Refinery complex is the fourth-largest oil refinery in the country; it is the world's 10th largest. Baton Rouge also has rail, highway, pipeline, and deep-water access. Dow Chemical Company has a large plant in Iberville Parish near Plaquemine, 17 miles (27 km) south of Baton Rouge. Shaw Construction, Turner, and Harmony all started with performing construction work at these plants.

The metropolitan also has a large medical research and clinical presence. Research hospitals have included Our Lady of the Lake, Our Lady of the Lake Children's Hospital (affiliated with St. Jude Children's Research Hospital), Mary Bird Perkins Cancer Center, and Earl K. Long (closed 2013). Together with an emerging medical corridor at Essen Lane, Summa Avenue and Bluebonnet Boulevard, Baton Rouge has been developing a medical district expected to be similar to the Texas Medical Center. LSU and Tulane University both announced plans to construct satellite medical campuses in Baton Rouge to partner with Our Lady of the Lake Medical Center and Baton Rouge General Medical Center, respectively.

See also
Louisiana census statistical areas
List of cities, towns, and villages in Louisiana
List of census-designated places in Louisiana
List of metropolitan areas of Louisiana

External links
 Official Baton Rouge Government Web Site
 Downtown Development District
 Baton Rouge Today
 Baton Rouge City Guide and Internet Rest Area 
 Perkins Rowe Shopping

References

 
Geography of Ascension Parish, Louisiana
Geography of East Baton Rouge Parish, Louisiana
Geography of East Feliciana Parish, Louisiana
Geography of Iberville Parish, Louisiana
Geography of Livingston Parish, Louisiana
Geography of Pointe Coupee Parish, Louisiana
Geography of St. Helena Parish, Louisiana
Geography of West Baton Rouge Parish, Louisiana
Geography of West Feliciana Parish, Louisiana